The men's singles competition of the table tennis event at the 2009 Southeast Asian Games will be held from 8 to 15 December at the Convention Hall, National University of Laos in Vientiane, Laos.

Participating nations
A total of 18 athletes from nine nations competed in men's singles table tennis at the 2009 Southeast Asian Games:

Schedule
All times are Laos Time (UTC+07:00).

Results

Group round

Group A

Group B

Group C

Group D

Elimination rounds

References

External links
 

2009 in table tennis
2009 Southeast Asian Games events